The 2006 World Group II Play-offs were four ties which involved the losing nations of the World Group II and four nations from the three Zonal Group I competitions. Nations that won their play-off ties entered the 2007 World Group II, while losing nations joined their respective zonal groups.

Israel vs. Indonesia
Indonesia was scheduled to play against {Israel on 15–16 July in Ramat HaSharon, but the Indonesians withdrew in protest to the violence that occurred in the Gaza Strip at that time of the year. Israel thus progressed to the 2007 World Group II, while Indonesia was relegated back down to Zonal Competition.

Canada vs. Argentina

Slovakia vs. Thailand

Switzerland vs. Australia

References

See also
Fed Cup structure

World Group II Play-offs